Dichomeris explicata is a moth in the family Gelechiidae. It was described by Edward Meyrick in 1929. It is found on New Hanover Island in the Bismarck Archipelago of Papua New Guinea.

The forewings are brownish ochreous, the costal edge suffused with pale ochreous from the base to three-fourths, the extreme base of the costa is blackish. The plical stigma is small and black and the posterior part of the costal and terminal edge are pale ochreous, with a series of small black dots. The hindwings are dark grey.

References

Moths described in 1929
explicata